Siaposht (also Romanized as Sīāposht; also known as Sīāh Posht) is a village in Kuhestani-ye Talesh Rural District, in the Central District of Talesh County, Gilan Province, Iran. At the 2006 census, its population was 58, in 12 families.

References 

Populated places in Talesh County